In Euclidean geometry the Newton line is the line that connects the midpoints of the two diagonals in a convex quadrilateral with at most two parallel sides.

Properties
The line segments  and  that connect the midpoints of opposite sides (the bimedians) of a convex quadrilateral intersect in a point that lies on the Newton line. This point  bisects the line segment  that connects the diagonal midpoints.

By Anne's theorem and its converse, any interior point P on the Newton line of a quadrilateral  has the property that

where  denotes the area of triangle .

If the quadrilateral is a tangential quadrilateral, then its incenter also lies on this line.

See also
Complete quadrangle
Newton's theorem (quadrilateral)
Newton–Gauss line

References

External links

 Alexander Bogomolny: Bimedians in a Quadrilateral at cut-the-knot.org

Quadrilaterals